Troy City Schools is the school district serving Troy, Ohio.

On February 10, 2014 Eric Herman, the district superintendent, notified Troy City Schools board of education that the Ohio School Facilities Commission gave the district a $17,985 grant to buy a security communication system. This would allow school employees to immediately send alerts to police officer vehicles and school offices.

Schools
 Troy High School
 Troy Junior High School
 Van Cleve 6th Grade School

K-5 elementary schools:
 Concord Elementary
 Cookson Elementary
 Forest Elementary
 Heywood Elementary
 Hook Elementary
 Kyle Elementary

In Van Cleve there are currently over 400 students.

References

External links
 Troy City Schools

School districts in Ohio
Education in Miami County, Ohio